During the Egyptian invasion of Kerma (Sudan) in 1504 BC, The Egyptian king Thutmose I invaded Kerma to remove the growing danger and be able to directly obtain the gold he wanted which Nubia was rich in.

The Egyptian Advance to The south 
Thutmose I's army marched south until it reached a rocky mountain called Jebel Barkal, a place where the priests of the Temple of Amun believe that it witnessed the birth of Amun, a pretext to invade the region and subject it to Egyptian rule. This area was of economic, religious and cultural importance to the ancient Egyptians, as it was rich in gold and other resources.

Reasons for the invasion 
When Egypt was experiencing internal turmoil and wars with the Hyksos, the Kingdom of Kerma attacked the southern lands of Egypt, and Kerma allied with the Hyksos, who were stationed in the northeastern delta and formed a military and political force there, which angered the Egyptians. After the Egyptians got rid of the Hyksos, King Ahmose decided to carry out attacks and punitive campaigns against the Kushites and defeated them. During the reign of Amenhotep I, he went out at the head of his army beyond the Egyptian borders in the north, south and west, and made three campaigns to Kerma in Sudan, where he penetrated into the south until he reached the third cataract of the Nile to expand the borders of Egypt there and after him came Thutmose I, who wanted to control the entire Kingdom of Kerma and his control extended to Kurgus beyond the Fourth Cataract.

References

Eighteenth Dynasty of Egypt
Wars involving ancient Egypt
2nd-millennium BC conflicts
Military history of Sudan